Alfred Percy Sinnett (18 January 1840 – 26 June 1921) was an English author and theosophist.

Biography 

Sinnett was born in London. His father died while he was young, as in 1851 Sinnett was listed as a "Scholar – London University", living with his mother Jane, who is listed as a widow and whose occupation is listed as "Periodical Literature"; his older sister Sophia, age 22, was a teacher.  Jane's sister Sarah, age 48, was also a teacher.

In 1870 Sinnett married his wife Patience, probably in the London area.  He is listed in the 1871 England Census at age 31, as a Journalist, born in Middlesex.  His wife Patience is 27, and her mother Clarissa Edenson a "Landowner", is living with them.By 1879, Sinnett had moved to India where he was "... the Editor of The Pioneer, the leading English Daily of India..." He relates in his book, The Occult World that: "...on the first occasion of my making Madame Blavatsky's acquaintance she became a guest at my home at Allahabad and remained there for six weeks..."

In 1880 Helena Blavatsky and Henry Steel Olcott visited the Sinnetts at their summer home in Simla. The Mahatma Letters, which generated the controversy that later helped lead to the split of the Theosophical Society were mostly written to Sinnett or his wife Patience.  The letters started at this time when Sinnett asked Blavatsky whether if he wrote a letter to her Mahatmas, she could arrange to have it delivered.

By 1884 Sinnett was back in England, where that year Constance Wachtmeister states that she met Blavatsky at the home of the Sinnetts in London.

Sinnett asked Charles Webster Leadbeater to come back to England to tutor his son Percy and George Arundale.  Leadbeater agreed and brought with him one of his pupils Curuppumullage Jinarajadasa.  Using "astral clairvoyance" Leadbeater assisted William Scott-Elliot to write his book The Story of Atlantis, for which Sinnett wrote the preface.

Sinnett was later president of the London Lodge of the Society.

By 1901 Sinnett is listed as an author.  His son Percy is also listed as an author and born in India.

See also  
 https://en.wikiquote.org/wiki/The_Ageless_Wisdom_Teachings
 Ascended masters
 Ascended Master Teachings
Alice A. Bailey
Helena Petrovna Blavatsky
Benjamin Creme
 Esoteric Buddhism
 Incidents in the Life of Madame Blavatsky* Hodgson Report
 Initiation (Theosophy)
Master K.H.
Master Morya
 K.H. Letters to C.W. Leadbeater
 Mahātmā 
Helena Roerich
 Theosophy
 Sinnett as fiction writer

Notes

Works 

 The Occult World (London: Trubner and Company, 1881) 
 Esoteric Buddhism (London: Trubner and Company, 1883).  Describes the concept of Root race, later adopted by Madame Blavatsky.
 Karma: A Novel (London: Chapman & Hall, 1885)
 Incidents in the Life of Madame Blavatsky: Compiled from Information Supplied by Her Relatives and Friends (1886)
 The Rationale of Mesmerism (Boston, Houghton, Mifflin and Company, 1892)
 The Growth of the Soul (Theosophical Publishing Society, London and Benares, 1896, 1905)]
 Occult Essays (Theosophical Publishing Society, London and Benares, 1905)
 Married by Degrees; A Play in 3 Acts (London, 1911)
 In the Next World: Actual Narratives of Personal Experiences by Some Who Have Passed On (Theosophical Publishing Society, London, 1914)
 The Spiritual Powers and the War (Theosophical Publishing Society, London, 1915)
 Unseen Aspects of the War: Two Articles by A.P. Sinnett (Theosophical Publishing Society, London, 1916)
 Super-Physical Science (Theosophical Publishing Society, London, 1919)
 Tennyson an Occultist, As His Writings Prove (Theosophical Publishing Society, London, 1920)
 The Early Days of Theosophy in Europe (Theosophical Publishing Society, London, 1922) (posthumous)

Literature 

 Autobiography of Alfred Percy Sinnett, Theosophical History Centre Publications, London 1986

Letters 

 Helena P. Blavatsky: The letters of H. P. Blavatsky to A. P. Sinnett and other miscellaneous letters, London 1925
A. Trevor Barker. The Mahatma Letters to A.P. Sinnett London 1926

See also
 https://en.wikiquote.org/wiki/The_Ageless_Wisdom_Teachings
 Agni Yoga
 Alice Bailey
Helena Petrovna Blavatsky
Benjamin Creme
 Initiation (Theosophy) 
 K.H. Letters to C.W. Leadbeater
Master K.H.
Master Morya 
Helena Roerich
 Theosophy

External links 

 
 
 The Mahatma Letters to Sinnett
 The Letters of HP Blavatsky to Sinnett
 Esoteric Buddhism by A.P. Sinnett
 The Occult World by A.P. Sinnett
 The Mahatmas and Their Letters
 Photography of Sinnett
 Book Review of Karma
 Occult Investigations

1840 births
1921 deaths
British male writers
British non-fiction writers
English Theosophists
Helena Blavatsky biographers
Male non-fiction writers
Writers from London